Thomas Joubert du Toit (born 5 May 1995) is a South African rugby union player for the South Africa national team and the  in the United Rugby Championship. His regular position is prop. His nickname is The Tank.

Career

Youth

He played for the Paarl Boys' High School first team in 2012 and 2013, also captaining the side in 2013.

In 2013, Du Toit was included in the South African Schools side that played in three matches in August of that year. He made a substitute appearance in a 19–14 victory match over England in Crawford, played the entire second match – a 17–13 victory against France in George and was an unused substitute in their final match, a 14–13 win over Wales in Worcester.

Du Toit then opted to move to Durban to join the  academy for 2014.

Du Toit was included in the South Africa Under-20 side for the 2014 IRB Junior World Championship.

In 2015, Du Toit was included in the South Africa Under-20 squad that toured Argentina. He started both of their tour matches and was then included in the final squad for the 2015 World Rugby Under 20 Championship. He started all three of their matches in Pool B of the competition; a 33–5 win against hosts Italy, a 40–8 win against Samoa which saw Du Toit score South Africa's first try of the match in the seventh minute and a 46–13 win over Australia to help South Africa finish top of Pool B to qualify for the semi-finals with the best record pool stage of all the teams in the competition. Du Toit started their semi-final match against England, but could not prevent them losing 20–28 to be eliminated from the competition by England for the second year in succession. He started their third-place play-off match against France, scoring his second try of the tournament to help South Africa to a 31–18 win to secure third place in the competition.

Senior club career

With no prior first class rugby behind his name, Du Toit was a surprise inclusion in the  squad for the 2014 Super Rugby season. Still finding himself behind the likes of Tendai Mtawarira in the pecking order, however, he dropped down to the  squad for the 2014 Vodacom Cup season. He came on as a half-time substitute and scored his first senior try just 15 minutes after coming on.

On 4 October 2016, it was announced that Du Toit would be joining Irish Pro14 side Munster on a three-month contract, following the completion of his Currie Cup commitments. On 26 November 2016, Du Toit made his competitive debut for Munster when he came on as a replacement in the sides 46–3 win against Benetton in a 2016–17 Pro12 fixture at Thomond Park.

South Africa 'A'

In 2016, Du Toit was included in a South Africa 'A' squad that played a two-match series against a touring England Saxons team. He was named in the starting line-up for their first match in Bloemfontein, but ended on the losing side as the visitors ran out 32–24 winners. He also started the second match of the series, a 26–29 defeat to the Saxons in George. He captained the South Africa A-side on 10 November 2022 against Munster Rugby and then again against the Bristol Bears on 17 November 2022.

Senior South Africa

Du Toit was not initially named in South Africa's squad for the 2019 Rugby World Cup. However he was called up to replace the injured Trevor Nyakane in the pool stage. South Africa went on to win the tournament, defeating England in the final.

References

External links
 

South African rugby union players
Living people
1995 births
Rugby union players from Cape Town
Sharks (Currie Cup) players
Sharks (rugby union) players
Barbarian F.C. players
South Africa Under-20 international rugby union players
Munster Rugby players
South Africa international rugby union players
Alumni of Paarl Boys' High School
Stade Toulousain players
Rugby union props